More United is a cross-party political movement in the United Kingdom. It describes itself as a "tech-driven political startup" that supports candidates regardless of party affiliation. The movement advocates public service investment, democratic reform, a green economy, tolerant society, and co-operation with the EU.

More United takes its name from the maiden speech delivered by Jo Cox, a British MP who was murdered in June 2016.

Values
The movement says it will support any candidate from any party who backs its values and pledges to advance them in Parliament:

 Opportunity: we need a fair economy that bridges the gap between rich and poor.
 Tolerance: we want to live in a free, diverse society where our differences are celebrated and respected.
 Democracy: we want you to have real influence over politics.
 Environment: we must do everything possible to tackle climate change and protect our environment.
 Openness: we welcome immigration, but understand it must work for everyone, and believe in bringing down international barriers, not raising them. We also want a close relationship with Europe.

History
Following the result of the 2016 UK referendum on EU membership, in which the country voted to withdraw from the European Union, there was considerable media discussion concerning the future of the British centre ground. Press rumours of a split in the Labour Party had occurred since Jeremy Corbyn's election as leader in 2015; this intensified after pro-EU members of his shadow cabinet resigned in protest of his allegedly weak support for the Remain campaign, leading to a leadership challenge by Owen Smith. The Conservatives also faced the prospect of an ideological split, as some pro-EU Conservatives feared the potential consequences of Andrea Leadsom defeating Theresa May in the leadership election; Leadsom ultimately withdrew from the race, handing unopposed victory to May. Paddy Ashdown, the former leader of the Liberal Democrats, wrote an article in The Times accusing both parties of failing to provide reasonable solutions to the issues afflicting communities across Britain.

More United was founded in July 2016 by a team drawn from business, academia, and politics: Austin Rathe, Bess Mayhew, Corinne Sawers and Maurice Biriotti.  They received support from cross party MPs, led by Paddy Ashdown.

Election campaigns

2016 Richmond Park by-election

More United voted to support Liberal Democrat candidate Sarah Olney, who subsequently defeated the incumbent MP, Zac Goldsmith, in December 2016.

2017 general election
On 23 November 2016, More United launched a crowdfunding campaign to raise money to help support candidates. By 22 December, the campaign had raised £274,164.

2019 general election
(Please note it is not uncommon for More United to endorse more than one candidate in the same seat)

Issue-based campaigns
Following the 2017 election, More United conducted UK-wide and online consultations with supporters to identify their priorities for the movement. The issues supporters identified as being the most important to campaign on were the NHS, equality and Brexit. More United has since selected its campaigns based on this information.

NHS/Brexit Campaign, 2018
In February 2017, More United launched a campaign to secure a Parliamentary debate on how Brexit will impact the NHS, arguing that the government has not given this question sufficient consideration. Thousands of supporters were mobilised to contact their MPs in support of the campaign, which led to 47 MPs from five parties submitting a request for a backbench business debate. That debate was held in Parliament on 22 March.

Campaign to restore the Access to Elected Office Fund, 2018
In April 2018, More United supported the launch of a legal challenge against the government, led by three deaf and disabled candidates of different parties, all of whom are also Members of More United. The focus of the challenge was to get the government to restore a Fund that existed from 2012–2015 to help deaf and disabled candidates of all parties, at all levels, with the extra costs of standing for election. The Fund was frozen and placed under review in 2015, but no findings from the review or a decision on the Fund's future had been published in nearly three years. More United launched a campaign alongside the legal challenge, with thousands of supporters signing a petition to get the government to restore the Fund.

This campaign received endorsement from 19 of the UK's most prominent deaf and disabled people, who came together from across the realms of business, entertainment, academia and politics to publish an open letter of support in The Sunday Times. The campaign also received backing from three disabled MPs from three parties. Labour MP Marsha de Cordova, Liberal Democrat MP Stephen Lloyd and Conservative MP Robert Halfon co-wrote a letter to the Home Office asking for the immediate restoration of the Fund.

Convenors
In addition to its founders, a number of prominent public figures have endorsed the movement's launch so far, with the following being listed as the organisation's Convenors:

 Josh Babarinde, social entrepreneur and youth worker
 Maurice Birotti, businessman and academic
 Jeremy Bliss, lawyer and entrepreneur
 Clare Gerada, medical practitioner
 Sunny Hundal, columnist and lecturer
 Anne-Marie Imafidon, social tech entrepreneur
 Martha Lane Fox, entrepreneur
 Gia Milinovich, writer and presenter
 Maajid Nawaz, author, activist and columnist
 Jonathon Porritt, environmentalist
 Luke Pritchard, musician and entertainer
 Simon Schama, writer, broadcaster and professor
 Janet Smith, former Lady Justice of Appeal
 Dan Snow, broadcaster
 Rumi Vergee, entrepreneur and philanthropist

See also 
 Independent Progressive

References

External links 
 
 The Convention on Brexit - part organised by More United

2016 United Kingdom European Union membership referendum
Brexit–related advocacy groups in the United Kingdom
Consequences of the 2016 United Kingdom European Union membership referendum
Jo Cox
Organisations based in the City of Westminster
Political movements in the United Kingdom
Progressivism in the United Kingdom
Pro-Europeanism in the United Kingdom
2016 establishments in the United Kingdom
2016 in British politics